Avena strigosa (also called lopsided oat, bristle oat or black oat; syn. Avena hispanica Ard.) is a species of grass native to Europe. It has edible seeds and is often cultivated as animal feed in southern Brazil. It is sometimes reported as a weed.

Description
Avena strigosa is a tufted grass growing to a height of 0.8–1.5 m. Its seeds are smaller than those of the common oat, Avena sativa.

Uses
Avena strigosa used to be cultivated as human food in Scotland, but it is now cultivated as a forage for ruminants in South America. It is a nutritive grass with a good protein content.

References

External links

Plants For A Future: Avena strigosa 
 Avena strigosa
USDA Avena strigosa
PDF Black oat (Avena strigosa) Plant Guide USDA
ScienceDirect Avena strigosa

Flora of Europe
strigosa
Cereals